Sally Rocks is a small group of rocks trending southwestwards in South Bay just off the west coast of Hurd Peninsula, Livingston Island in the South Shetland Islands, Antarctica.

The feature's name derives from the name 'Sallys Cove' applied in 1820-23 by James Weddell to a cove in the vicinity.

Location
British mapping in 1968, detailed Spanish mapping in 1991, and Bulgarian mapping in 2005, 2009 and 2017.

Sally Rocks Camp
The Bulgarian Sally Rocks Camp on the Hurd Peninsula beach facing the rocks supported geological research on southern Hurd Peninsula in 2005/06 and subsequent seasons.

See also 
 Composite Antarctic Gazetteer
 List of Antarctic islands south of 60° S
 SCAR
 Territorial claims in Antarctica
 List of Antarctic field camps

Maps
 Isla Livingston: Península Hurd. Mapa topográfico de escala 1:25000. Madrid: Servicio Geográfico del Ejército, 1991. (Map reproduced on p. 16 of the linked work)
 L.L. Ivanov et al., Antarctica: Livingston Island and Greenwich Island, South Shetland Islands (from English Strait to Morton Strait, with illustrations and ice-cover distribution), Scale 1: 100000 map, Antarctic Place-names Commission of Bulgaria, Ministry of Foreign Affairs, Sofia, 2005.
 L.L. Ivanov. Antarctica: Livingston Island and Greenwich, Robert, Snow and Smith Islands. Scale 1:120000 topographic map.  Troyan: Manfred Wörner Foundation, 2009.
 Antarctic Digital Database (ADD). Scale 1:250000 topographic map of Antarctica. Scientific Committee on Antarctic Research (SCAR). Since 1993, regularly upgraded and updated.
 L.L. Ivanov. Antarctica: Livingston Island and Smith Island. Scale 1:100000 topographic map. Manfred Wörner Foundation, 2017.

References

External links
 Sally Rocks. SCAR Composite Antarctic Gazetteer

Rock formations of Livingston Island